Governor Wallace Rider Farrington High School is a public grades 9–12 high school located in the Kalihi district of Honolulu on the island of Oahu, Hawaii, United States.

The school is named after the late Wallace Rider Farrington, the sixth governor of the Territory of Hawaii, who served from 1921 to 1929.

Farrington is an urban high school that serves a community of mostly lower socio-economic families and a smaller number of middle-class families.

FHS is the home of the Governors and is part of the Hawaii State Department of Education.

During World War II, the U.S. Army used the school as a hospital.

Farrington High School was honored as a 2017 Model School by the International Center for Leadership in Education.

Campus
Farrington High School was designed by noted Hawaii architect Charles William Dickey . The 26 acre (100,000 m²) campus, which is located at 1564 North King Street, Honolulu, is bounded on the north by Interstate H-1, on the west by Kalihi Street, and on the east by Houghtailing Street. The surrounding neighborhood consists of a mix of residential, commercial, and industrial properties.  The campus boasts the sculpture The Seed by renowned Hawaiian artist Satoru Abe.

Notable alumni

Listed alphabetically by last name (year of graduation):
 Simeon R. Acoba, Jr. (1962) – associate justice, Hawaii State Supreme Court (2000–present)
 Bob Apisa (1963) – college football All-American Michigan State University 
 Dennis Arakaki – Hawaii state representative (1985-2006)
 Benjamin J. Cayetano (1958) – Governor of Hawaii (1994–2002); first Filipino-American governor in the U.S.
 Nuu Faaola (1982) – National Football League player, New York Jets and Miami Dolphins (1986–89)
 Mario Fatafehi (1999) – NFL player, Denver Broncos (2003–04)
 Ta'ase Faumui – football player, Pittsburgh Steelers (1994–95)
 Dick Jensen – entertainer, Christian evangelist
 Shawn Lauvao – offensive lineman for NFL's Washington Redskins
 Vince Manuwai (1999) – NFL player, Jacksonville Jaguars 2003–10
 John Matias – MLB player, Chicago White Sox
 Donna Mercado Kim – Hawaii state senator (2000–present); former state senate president (2012-2015)
 Janet Mock (2001) – writer, TV host and author of New York Times bestseller Redefining Realness
 Al Noga (1983) – former NFL player
 Niko Noga (1979) – former NFL player
 Jesse Sapolu (1979) – NFL player, San Francisco 49ers, 4-time Super Bowl champion
 Josh White – football player, Arena Football League
 Wally Kaname Yonamine (1945) – NFL player, San Francisco 49ers (1947); Nippon Professional Baseball (Japan), Yomiuri Giants, Chunichi Dragons; Japanese Baseball Hall of Fame (1994); founder/owner, Wally Yonamine Pearls – Roppongi, Tokyo, Japan; philanthropist – Wally Yonamine Foundation; Governors Hall of Fame (2007 inductee)

Demographics

There were 2,569 students as of the 2014–15 school year, with the following racial composition:

 White: 1.3%
 Black: 0.6%
 Hispanic: 1.2%
 Asian/Pacific Islander: 94.7%
 American Indian: 0.4%
 Two of more races: 1.8%

As of 2017, the school has over 60% free and reduced lunch students, 10% Special Education students, and 11% English Language Learners.

References
Hawaii High School Athletic Association (n.d.). Farrington High School HHSAA Championship Records. Retrieved May 14, 2007, from HHSAA Web site: http://www.sportshigh.com/tournament_records/by_school/Farrington+High+School
Hawaii State Department of Education (n.d.). School Status and Improvement Report (School Year 2004–2005): Governor Wallace Rider Farrington High School. Retrieved December 5, 2005, from State of Hawaii Department of Education, Accountability Resource Center Hawaii Web site: http://arch.k12.hi.us/school/ssir/2005/honolulu.html
Gee, P. (March 6, 2005). Farrington’s Govs’ Guard has right moves. Honolulu Star-Bulletin. Retrieved December 6, 2005, from http://starbulletin.com/2005/03/06/news/story9.html
Hiller, J. (December 13, 2001). That old school tie is a bootstrap, governor. Honolulu Advertiser. Retrieved June 4, 2004, from http://the.honoluluadvertiser.com/article/2001/Dec/13/ln/ln28a.htm

External links
 Hawaii State Department of Education

Public high schools in Honolulu
Educational institutions established in 1936
1936 establishments in Hawaii